For My Pain... was a gothic metal supergroup from Oulu, Finland, featuring members from Embraze, Eternal Tears of Sorrow, Nightwish, Charon and Reflexion. The band released their debut album Fallen in 2003, but has since not released any further full-length albums.

History 
The idea of For My Pain... started in 1999, when Altti Veteläinen and Petri Sankala, both from Eternal Tears of Sorrow, wanted to start a new project. They asked two old friends, Tuomas Holopainen and Lauri Tuohimaa, to join. All parties were interested, but as everyone was too busy, the project was postponed.

A few years later the idea came up again, this time with a better timing since both Eternal Tears of Sorrow and Nightwish were having breaks. Two new members were asked to join, Olli-Pekka Törrö and Juha Kylmänen, and the band started recording their debut album in 2001.

For My Pain...'s debut album Fallen was released in 2003. Finnish music magazine Soundi gave the album three out of five stars. In 2004, the band released a single, "Killing Romance", which peaked at number seven on the official Finnish single chart.

As of 2004, For My Pain... has been placed on an indefinite hiatus.

Last known lineup 
 Altti Veteläinen – bass (see Eternal Tears of Sorrow, ex-Kalmah, ex-National Napalm Syndicate)
 Petri Sankala – drums (see ex-Eternal Tears of Sorrow, ex-Kalmah)
 Tuomas Holopainen – keyboards (see Nightwish)
 Lauri Tuohimaa – guitars (see ex-Charon, ex-Embraze)
 Olli-Pekka Törrö – guitars (see ex-Eternal Tears of Sorrow)
 Juha Kylmänen – vocals (ex-Reflexion)

Discography 
Albums
 Fallen (2003)

Singles
 "Killing Romance" (only released in Finland, 2004)

References

External links 
 For My Pain... on Myspace

Finnish gothic metal musical groups
Heavy metal supergroups
Musical groups established in 1999
1999 establishments in Finland